Sir John Desmond Augustine Fennell, OBE (17 September 1933 – 29 June 2011) was a British barrister and judge who chaired the public inquiry into the 1987 King's Cross fire. He was a High Court judge from 1990 to 1992, when he was forced to retire as a result of a stroke.

References 

1933 births
2011 deaths
Queen's Bench Division judges
Knights Bachelor
Officers of the Order of the British Empire
People educated at Ampleforth College
Alumni of Corpus Christi College, Cambridge
Grenadier Guards officers
Members of the Inner Temple
English King's Counsel
20th-century King's Counsel